Alfred Perry is a Montreal arsonist. He is known to be one of the instigators of the fire at the Parliament Building of Canada in 1849 in Montreal. He was also a promoter of the Douglas Hospital. He was known for being among the insurrectionist leaders that participated in the events that lead to the burning of the Parliament buildings in Montreal in 1849. According to his own testimony made several years later, he claimed to have been the one that directly caused the fire during the storming, by accident.

References

Year of birth missing
Year of death missing
Canadian firefighters
People from Montreal